Holte is a neighbourhood in the city of Kristiansand in Agder county, Norway. It's located in the borough of Oddernes and in the district of Randesund. The neighborhood of Tømmerstø lies to the south and Frikstad lies to the east. Holte Junior High is the only junior high in Randesund.

References

Geography of Kristiansand
Neighbourhoods of Kristiansand